18 Candles: The Early Years is the first compilation album by Silverstein, released in 2006. It compiles their first two previously released, then-out-of-print EPs Summer's Stellar Gaze and When the Shadows Beam, along with some newly recorded acoustic and live material and a remix of the song "Smile in Your Sleep". By July 2006, the album had sold over 20,000 copies.

Track listing
Summer's Stellar Gaze (2000)

When the Shadows Beam (2002)

Bonus tracks (2006)

Personnel 
Silverstein
Shane Told – Lead vocals; bass guitar (Summer's Stellar Gaze)
Josh Bradford – Rhythm guitar
Neil Boshart – Lead guitar
Billy Hamilton – Bass guitar, backing vocals
Paul Adam Koehler – Drums, percussion, guitar
Richard McWalter - Lead guitar (Summer's Stellar Gaze)
Production
Engineered by Scott Komer, Justin Koop and Cameron Webb
Produced by Shane Told, Alan Szymkowiak, Justin Koop and Cameron Webb
Mixed by Alan Szymkowiak, Scott Komer and Cameron Webb
Josh Bradford, Andy Owens and Kevin Kennaley - photographers

Chart positions

References

External links

18 Candles: The Early Years at YouTube (streamed copy where licensed)

Silverstein (band) compilation albums
2006 compilation albums
Victory Records compilation albums